The 1999 NAIA Division I women's basketball tournament was the tournament held by the NAIA to determine the national champion of women's college basketball among its Division I members in the United States and Canada for the 1998–99 basketball season.

Oklahoma City defeated Simon Fraser in the championship game, 72–55, to claim the Stars' second NAIA national title and first since 1988. This was the first appearance in the championship game for a team from Canada.

The tournament was played at the Oman Arena in Jackson, Tennessee.

Qualification

The tournament field remained fixed at thirty-two teams, with the top sixteen teams receiving seeds. 

The tournament continued to utilize a simple single-elimination format.

Bracket

See also
1999 NAIA Division I men's basketball tournament
1999 NCAA Division I women's basketball tournament
1999 NCAA Division II women's basketball tournament
1999 NCAA Division III women's basketball tournament
1999 NAIA Division II women's basketball tournament

References

NAIA
NAIA Women's Basketball Championships
1999 in sports in Tennessee